"The Crumbs on the Table" is a German fairy tale collected by the Brothers Grimm, number 190.

It is Aarne-Thompson type 236*, Imitating Bird Sounds, because in the original Swiss dialect, the responses imitate live chickens.

Synopsis
A countryman tells his puppies to come into the parlor and take the crumbs.  They say the mistress will beat them, but he persists and persuades them.  The mistress returns just then and beats them, and the countryman only laughs, so they have to run away.

References

Grimms' Fairy Tales
German fairy tales
ATU 220-249